Glossodoris aureola is a species of sea slug, a dorid nudibranch, a shell-less marine gastropod mollusk in the family Chromodorididae.

Distribution
This species is found only in New Caledonia, in the Western Pacific Ocean.

References

Chromodorididae
Gastropods described in 1995